State Route 132 (SR 132) is a north–south state highway in the southwestern portion of the U.S. state of Ohio.  Its southern terminus is at its interchange with U.S. Route 52 in New Richmond and its northern terminus is at its intersection with SR 350 and SR 133 in Clarksville.

History
SR 132 was commissioned in 1923 on the same route as it currently follows, between New Richmond and Owensville. The highway between New Richmond and Batavia was paved in 1927. In 1937 the route was extended north to Clarksville. The section of road between SR 131 and Clarksville was paved in 1942. The final section to be paved was between Owensville and SR 131, and it was paved in 1946.

Major intersections

References

132
Transportation in Clermont County, Ohio
Transportation in Clinton County, Ohio
Transportation in Warren County, Ohio